"State Anthem of the Lithuanian SSR" was the regional anthem of the Lithuanian Soviet Socialist Republic from 1950 to 1989 when Lithuania was occupied by the Soviet Union during that period.

History
During the Soviet rule in Lithuania, the song was adopted by the Lithuanian SSR government in 1950, substituted for the Tautiška giesmė, 
which was used briefly as a national anthem of Lithuania in 1944 until 1950. In 1988, the official anthem of the Republic of Lithuania (Tautiška giesmė) was once again openly utilized as the Lithuanian anthem, and its status as the national anthem was restored by the independent Lithuanian government in 1992 and is still used today. In 2015, during the victory ceremony for the Lithuanian team in World Deaf Basketball Championships in Taoyuan, Taiwan, the Soviet-era song was heard once again, causing some discomforts to the Lithuanians. Later that day, Taipei apologizes to Vilnius for choosing the wrong anthem, said the organizers was mistakenly put it instead of the national anthem, Tautiška giesmė.

Background
The music was composed by Balys Dvarionas and Jonas Švedas, and the original lyrics authored by Antanas Venclova. After Joseph Stalin's death, Vacys Reimeris changed the second stanza of the lyrics to remove mention of Stalin. The second stanza lyrics were changed to state that Lenin had lit the path to freedom, helped by the Russian people, led by the party (Reimeris changed the word "Stalin" to "party") and exhorted the Lithuanian people to work with peoples of the other Soviet Republics. This Soviet era anthem was confirmed in Article 169 of the 1978 Constitution of the Lithuanian SSR (this is the version presented below). 
The Soviet era anthem for the Lithuanian SSR is presented below:

Lyrics

1978-1988 version

1950-1953 version

Notes

References

External links
 Instrumental recording in MP3 format (Full version)
 Instrumental recording in MP3 format (Short version)
 MIDI file
 Vocal recording in MP3 format
 Lyrics - nationalanthems.info
 Original version (1950-1953)

Lithuanian SSR
Lithuanian Soviet Socialist Republic